Malhoo (Urdu:ملہو)  is a village in the Chach Valley of Attock District in Punjab, Pakistan.

Geography
Malhoo is situated 6 km north of Kamra from Rawalpindi-Peshawar GT Road and six kilometres south of the Indus River.

Notable people
 Lieutenant General Jahan Dad Khan, the 14th Governor of Sindh, Chairman of the Pakistan Red Crescent Society and President of the Al-Shifa Eye Trust, founded many eye hospitals and won awards for his national and international humanitarian work to prevent blindness.

References

Villages in Attock District